Aires Rodrigo da Encarnação Sousa (born 17 September 1998) is a Portuguese professional footballer  who plays as a forward for C.S. Marítimo B.

Career
Born in Funchal, Sousa made his professional debut with Sporting da Covilhã in a 2017–18 LigaPro match against União da Madeira on 10 December 2017.

References

External links

Aires Sousa at ZeroZero

1998 births
Living people
Sportspeople from Funchal
Portuguese footballers
Association football forwards
S.L. Benfica footballers
S.C. Covilhã players
C.F. Os Armacenenses players
Liga Portugal 2 players
Campeonato de Portugal (league) players